Stanislav Tecl (born 1 September 1990) is a Czech professional footballer who plays as a forward for Slavia Prague in the Fortuna Liga.

Club career
Tecl has captained Jihlava. On 27 May 2017, he scored two goals in Slavia Prague's 4–0 win against Zbrojovka Brno in the final match of the season that clinched the title for his team.

He scored two goals as Slavia Prague won the 2017–18 Czech Cup final 3–1 against Jablonec on 9 May 2018.

International career
He has represented the Czech Republic at youth level, before making his senior international debut in a 2–0 win in a friendly match against Turkey in February 2013.

Career statistics

Club

International

Honours

Club
Viktoria Plzeň
Czech First League: 2012–13,  2014–15

Slavia Prague
Czech First League: 2016–17

References

External links

Profile at Slavia Prague website
UEFA profile

1990 births
Living people
People from Jindřichův Hradec
Czech footballers
Association football forwards
Czech Republic youth international footballers
Czech Republic under-21 international footballers
Czech Republic international footballers
Czech First League players
FC Vysočina Jihlava players
SK Slavia Prague players
FC Viktoria Plzeň players
FK Jablonec players
Czech National Football League players
Sportspeople from the South Bohemian Region